S&R Membership Shopping is a chain of membership-only retail warehouse club in the Philippines.

History

S&R Membership Shopping was established in 2001 as S&R Pricemart under a partnership with PriceSmart of the United States. The name "S&R" stands for American businessmen Sol and Robert Price, founders of Price Club and PriceSmart. PriceSmart is the first major foreign retailer to enter the Philippine market since the passage of the Retail Trade Act 2000 which liberalized the retail sector. The first Philippine branch of PriceSmart opened at Bonifacio Global City, Taguig in November 2001.

PriceSmart sold its share in the joint venture in 2005 and was acquired by the Co family in 2006, and the retail chain was renamed as S&R Membership Shopping. The Co family's operations over S&R is taken care of by Kareila Management, Inc. which also operates the Puregold Price Club.

S&R expanded outside Metro Manila, when it opened its fifth branch in Mandaue, Cebu in 2010. The chain's first four chains were in Metro Manila.

In 2012, Puregold and Kareila underwent a merger. The former bought all the stakes of Kareila Management over S&R.

Business model
S&R Membership Shopping follows the warehouse club concept popularized in the United States. Its branches or "warehouses" are only open to members. S&R is meant for the upper middle class demographic. S&R also has a tire center at its branches. S&R also has a restaurant chain that is open to the general public without membership necessary, highlighting their New York-styled pizza.

Branches

S&R has 22 branches as of November 2021. The first branch is located in Bonifacio Global City, opened in 2001.

References

Supermarkets of the Philippines
2001 establishments in the Philippines

External links